Cyril John Findlay (5 February 1935 – 19 May 2007) was an Australian professional Grand Prix motorcycle road racer. He is noted for having one of the longest racing careers in Grand Prix history spanning 20 years, as well as one of four riders (along with Ángel Nieto, Loris Capirossi and Valentino Rossi) to race in Grand Prix motorcycle racing for 20 years or more.  He competed at the highest level despite racing as a privateer - that is, not as a contracted member of a factory team - throughout most of his racing career.

Motorcycle racing career
Findlay was born in Mooroopna, Victoria, roughly 120 miles north of Melbourne.  He began racing aged 15, two years under age, taking the name "Jack" so he could use the identification documents of his father, John 'Jock' Findlay, a Scottish immigrant to Australia.  After leaving school, he worked as a trainee accountant at Commonwealth Bank of Australia until 1957.

He moved to England in 1958 to race, got a job at the BSA factory in Birmingham, and joined the Grand Prix circuit with a 350cc Norton Manx.  He competed in his first Isle of Man TT in 1959. He competed on the Grand Prix circuit from 1958 to 1978.

His best championship result was in 1968 when he rode a Matchless to finish second behind Giacomo Agostini in the 500cc class. In 1971 he won his first race for Suzuki at the Ulster Grand Prix. As well as marking Suzuki's first 500cc class victory, the victory was notable for being the first 500cc class win for a motorcycle powered by a two stroke engine. His greatest victory came in 1973 when he won the Isle of Man Senior TT after 15 years of trying. 

Findlay competed in the inaugural Formula 750 European championship in 1973, winning the Swedish round at the Anderstorp Raceway along with a third place in Finland and a second place in Great Britain to finish the season ranked third in the championship behind Barry Sheene and John Dodds. He rode Suzuki TR500s in 1973 and 1974. 

In 1974, he was a member of the Suzuki factory racing team and helped develop the Suzuki RG 500, with Barry Sheene and Paul Smart. He once again finished in third place in the 1974 Formula 750 season, this time behind Dodds and Patrick Pons. In 1975, he defeated Sheene for the 1975 Formula 750 championship.  An accident that fractured his skull curtailed his racing career, and he retired in 1978. A further high-speed accident in 1987 stopped him riding motorcycles.

He married Dominique Monneret, the widow of Georges Monneret, and made his domestic base in France and has a son, Gregory Findlay.  He was appointed Grand Prix technical director by the Fédération Internationale de Motocyclisme in 1992, retaining the post until he retired in 2001. He was assisted by his fluency in French and Italian. The French film director Jérôme Laperrousaz made a documentary movie about road racing called Continental Circus in 1972. It starred Findlay and Giacomo Agostini and featured a soundtrack by the psychedelic rock band Gong, including a song called "Blues for Findlay". A bronze statue of Findlay on a TT-winning Suzuki by Philip Mune was unveiled in July 2006, in a park in his hometown that was renamed the Jack Findlay Reserve.

Motorcycle Grand Prix results
Points system from 1950 to 1968:

Points system from 1969 onwards:

(key) (Races in italics indicate fastest lap)

References

External links
"Aussie ex-rider Findlay dies", Fox Sports, 20 May 2007
 Obituary, The Daily Telegraph, 4 June 2007
 Obituary, The Times, 12 June 2007

1935 births
2007 deaths
People from Mooroopna
Sportsmen from Victoria (Australia)
Australian motorcycle racers
125cc World Championship riders
250cc World Championship riders
350cc World Championship riders
500cc World Championship riders
Isle of Man TT riders
Australian people of Scottish descent
Australian expatriate sportspeople in England